Regiunea Buzău (Buzău Region) was one of the newly established (in 1950) administrative divisions of the People's Republic of Romania, copied after the Soviet style of territorial organisation.

History
The capital of the region was Buzău, and its territory comprised an area similar to the nowadays Buzău County. In 1952 it was dissolved by merging with Prahova Region to form Ploiești Region.

Neighbours
Buzău Region had as neighbours:

East: Galați Region; South: Ialomița Region; West: Prahova Region; North: Stalin Region and Putna Region.

Rayons
Buzău, Râmnicu Sărat, Pogoanele, Pătârlagele, Beceni.

Regions of the People's Republic of Romania